Hans Tostrup (20 October 1799 – 27 January 1856) was a Norwegian politician, civil servant and government official.

Tostrup was born at Hjelmeland in Rogaland, Norway. He was the son of infantry captain Nicolai Tostrup (1768–1858) and his wife Thale Margrethe Resen Holfeldt (1779–1860). He was one of eight siblings in a family which included goldsmith Jacob Tostrup (1806–1890) and  timber merchant Christopher Tostrup (1804-1881) who co-owned the company Tostrup & Mathiesen.

He started a military career, but due to declining vision he switched to a civil servant career, graduating as cand.jur. in 1824. From 1832 to 1836, he was  appointed as a secretary at the University of Christiania (now University of Oslo).  For the next seven years,  he held a position at Fredriksvern (Fredriksvern verft)  in Stavern.

Tostrup was acting County Governor of Jarlsberg og Laurvigs Amt (now Vestfold) in 1843, County Governor of Nordre Bergenhus Amt (now Sogn og Fjordane) from 1844 to 1852, and County Governor of Kristians Amt (now Oppland) from 1852 to 1854. He was elected to the Norwegian Parliament in 1848, representing Nordre Bergenhus Amt. He stood for re-election, but failed.

References

1799 births
1856 deaths
People from Hjelmeland
Members of the Storting
County governors of Norway
Sogn og Fjordane politicians